Rossano Brazzi (18 September 1916 – 24 December 1994) was an Italian actor.

Biography
Brazzi was born in Bologna, Italy, the son of Maria Ghedini and Adelmo Brazzi, an employee of the Rizzoli shoe factory. He was named after Rossano Veneto, where his father was stationed during his military service in World War I. Brazzi attended San Marco University in Florence, Italy, where he was raised from the age of four. He was a lawyer before becoming an actor and made his film debut in 1939.

He moved to Hollywood in 1948 and was propelled to international fame with his role in the English-language film Three Coins in the Fountain (1954), followed by the leading male role in David Lean's Summertime (1955), opposite Katharine Hepburn. In 1958, he played the lead as Frenchman Emile De Becque in the Rodgers and Hammerstein musical South Pacific.  His other notable English-language films include The Barefoot Contessa (1954), The Story of Esther Costello (1957), opposite Joan Crawford, Count Your Blessings (1959), Light in the Piazza (1962), and The Italian Job (1969).

Personal life

Marriages and relationships
In 1940, Brazzi married baroness Lidia Bertolini (1921–1981) to whom he was married until her death from liver cancer in 1981. The couple had no children. However, he did father a son, George Llewellyn Brady (born 24 July 1955), from a relationship with 20-year-old Llewella Humphreys (1934–1992), the daughter of American mobster Murray Humphreys. Llewella Humphreys later changed her name to Luella Brady, an anglicization of Brazzi. In 1984, Rossano Brazzi married Ilse Fischer, a German national, who had been the couple's housekeeper for many years. Originally from Düsseldorf, Fischer had met Brazzi as an infatuated fan in Rome at the age of twenty-four. This marriage was also childless.

Eccentricities

Brazzi was known in film production circles for a number of strange traits, including his preference for ordering off-menu and his love of karaoke. He was often referred to among contemporaries by his nickname Merlion.

Death

Brazzi died in Rome on Christmas Eve 1994, aged 78, from a neural virus.

Selected filmography

Il destino in tasca (1938)
Piccolo hotel (1939)
Processo e morte di Socrate (1939) as Simmia
Bridge of Glass (1940) as comandante Mario Marchi
 Kean (1940) as Edmund Kean
Ritorno (1940) as Michele Donato, alias Mac Dynar
La fuerza bruta (1941) as Fred
Tosca (1941) as Mario Cavaradossi
 The Hero of Venice (1941) as Guido Fuser, suo figlio
The King's Jester (1941) as Il re Francesco Iº
A Woman Has Fallen (1941) as Roberto Frassi
We the Living (1942) as Leo Kovalenski
Girl of the Golden West (1942) as William / Manuel
The Gorgon (1942) sa Lamberto Finquinaldo
I due Foscari (1942) as Jacopo Foscari
Piazza San Sepolcro (1942)
 Maria Malibran (1943) as Carlo de Beriot
Back Then (1943) as Pablo, Radrennfahrer und Clown
Il treno crociato (1943) as Il tenente Alberto Lauri
Silenzio, si gira! (1943) as Andrea Corsi
The Ten Commandments (1945) (segment "Non commettere atti impuri")
La Resa di Titì (1945) as Guido, il diplomatico
La casa senza tempo (1945) as Capitano Paolo Sivera
Paese senza pace (1946) as Tita Nane
Malìa (1946) as Cola, cognato di Jana
Black Eagle (1946) as Vladimir Dubrowskij
La monaca di Monza (1947)
 The Great Dawn (1947) as Renzo Gamba
Fury (1947) as Antonio
Bullet for Stefano (1947) as Stefano Pelloni
The Courier of the King (1947) as Julien Sorel
 The White Devil (1947) as Prince André Mdwani as Il diavolo bianco
Eleonora Duse (1947) as Arrigo Boito
I contrabbandieri del mare (1948) as Mario
Little Women (1949) as Professor Bhaer
Volcano (1950) as Donato
The Fighting Men (1950) as Saro Costa
Romanzo d'amore (1950) as Enrico Toselli
The Black Crown (1951) as Andrés
Tragic Spell (1951) as Pietro
Revenge of Black Eagle (1951) as Vladimir Dubrovskij
 The Mistress of Treves (1952) as Sigfrido, conte di Treviri
The Woman Who Invented Love (1952) as Conte Grilli
Milady and the Musketeers (1952) as Conte de la Fere aka Athos
 They Were Three Hundred (1952) as Volpintesta
Son of the Hunchback (1952) as Philippe de Lagardère
 Guilt Is Not Mine (1952) as Carlo Rocchi
Prisoner in the Tower of Fire (1953) as Cesare Borgia
Carne de horca (1953) as Juan Pablo de Osuna
C'era una volta Angelo Musco (1953) as The story-teller
La Chair et le Diable (1954) as Giuseppe Guardini
Three Coins in the Fountain (1954) as Georgio Bianchi
La contessa di Castiglione (1954) as Le comte de Cavour
The Barefoot Contessa (1954) as Count Vincenzo Torlato-Favrini
Angela (1954) as Nino
 Barrier of the Law (1954) as Lt. Mario Grandi
The Last Five Minutes (1955) as Dino Moriani
Summertime (1955) as Renato de Rossi
Il conte Aquila (1955) as Conte Federico Confalonieri
Faccia da mascalzone (1956)
Loser Takes All (1956) as Bertrand
The Story of Esther Costello (1957) as Carlo Landi
Interlude (1957) as Tonio Fischer
Legend of the Lost (1957) as Paul Bonnard
South Pacific (1958) as Emile De Becque
A Certain Smile (1958) as Luc Ferrand
Count Your Blessings (1959) as Charles Edouard de Valhubert
Siege of Syracuse (1960) as Archimede
Austerlitz (1960) as Lucien Bonaparte
Mondo cane (1962) as Himself
Light in the Piazza (1962) as Signor Naccarelli
Rome Adventure (1962) as Roberto Orlandi
Redhead (1962) as Fabio
Three Fables of Love (1962) as Leo (segment "Le lièvre et le tortue")
Dark Purpose (1964) as Count Paolo Barbarelli
La ragazza in prestito (1964) as Mario Menacci
Instant Love (1964) - Claudio DeSantis
The Battle of the Villa Fiorita (1965) as Lorenzo
Un amore (1965) as Antonio Dorigo
The Christmas That Almost Wasn't (1966) as Phineas T. Prune
The Bobo (1967) as Carlos Matabosch
La ragazza del bersagliere (1967) as Fernando Moschino
Per amore... per magia... (1967) as Il narratore
Woman Times Seven (1967) as Giorgio (segment "Amateur Night")
Gli altri, gli altri... e noi (1967)
King of Africa (1968) as Dr. Hamilton
Criminal Affair (1968) as Ross Simpson (also wrote and directed)
Krakatoa, East of Java (1969) as Giovanni Borghese
Il diario segreto di una minorenne (è nata una donna) (1968)
Psychout for Murder (1969) as Brigoli
The Italian Job (1969) as Beckerman
Vita segreta di una diciottenne (1969)
The Adventurers (1970) as Baron de Coyne
Intimità proibita di una giovane sposa (1970) as Adolfo Rogano
Trittico (1971) as Andrea, the Surgeon
Mister Kingstreet's War (1971) as Major Bernadelli
Vivi ragazza vivi! (1971) as padre di Barbara
Drummer of Vengeance (1971) as The Sheriff
Racconti proibiti... di niente vestiti (1972) as Lorenzo del Cambio
The Great Waltz (1972) as Tedesco
Frankenstein's Castle of Freaks (1974) as Count Frankenstein
Giro girotondo... con il sesso è bello il mondo (1975)
Dracula in the Provinces (1975) as Dr. Paluzzi
Gli angeli dalle mani bendate (1975)
Season for Assassins (1975) as Father Eugenio
Political Asylum (1975) as Ambassador Lara
Caribia (1978)
Mr. Too Little (1978) as Zabo The Great
Catherine and I (1980) as Arthur
Champagne... e fagioli (1980) as Narrator (uncredited)
Omen III: The Final Conflict (1981) as DeCarlo
Anche i ladri hanno un santo (1981)
Il paramedico (1982) as Augusto Pinna
The Far Pavilions (1982)
Hart to Hart (1983) as Pastori
Fear City (1984) as Carmine
Final Justice (1985) as Don Lamanna
Formula for a Murder (1985) as Dr. Sernich
The Third Solution (1988) as Marini
Fatal Frames - Fotogrammi mortali (1996) as Dr. Lucidi (final film role)

References

External links

1916 births
1994 deaths
Italian male film actors
Italian male television actors
Actors from Bologna
Actors from Florence
20th-century Italian male actors
20th-century Italian  male singers
Burials at the Cimitero Flaminio